Francisco Expedito Lopes (July 8, 1914 – July 2, 1957) was a Brazilian Catholic bishop.

Biography
He was born in Sítio Jerusalém (Vila de Meruoca) in Sobral, in the state of Ceará. He was ordained a priest in Rome in 1938, holy bishop in Sobral in 1948, and was elected first bishop in Oeiras, in the state of Piauí. In 1955 he was sworn in as the fifth bishop of Garanhuns in the state of Pernambuco. He founded the Institute of the Missionaries of Our Lady of Fatima of Brazil. He was the victim of a shooting attack by Father Hosana de Siqueira e Silva in Garanhuns on July 1, 1957, and died the next day.

His motto was "Restore everything in Christ."

Considered a saint by the population, Don Acácio Rodrigues Alves became the postulator of his beatification in the Diocese of Garanhuns.

References 

1914 births
1957 deaths
Catholic bishops in Brazil